Neqareh Chiyan (also Romanized as Neqāreh Chīyān) is a village in Rud Pish Rural District, in the Central District of Fuman County, Gilan Province, Iran. At the 2006 census, its population was 25, in 8 families.

References 

Populated places in Fuman County